The Alum Tulcea Power Station will be a large electricity producer in Romania, having 5 natural gas-fired groups of 50 MW each totalling an installed capacity of 250 MW and an electricity generation capacity of around 0.6 TWh/year.

The power plant will be situated in the Tulcea County (Eastern Romania) near Alum Tulcea's industrial facility in Tulcea.

References

Natural gas-fired power stations in Romania
Proposed natural gas-fired power stations
Proposed power stations in Romania